Kimberly Michelle Insalaco (born November 4, 1980) is an American ice hockey player. She won a bronze medal at the 2006 Winter Olympics. She graduated from Brown University in 2003.

Before Brown
Insalaco was educated at Choate Rosemary Hall in Wallingford, Connecticut, where in 1999 she was and played for the Connecticut Polar Bears. She was the 1999 New England Prep School Player of the Year, Boston Globe All-Scholastic Selection, Hockey Night in Boston Most Valuable Forward, and Hockey Night in Boston All-Scholastic Tournament MVP. She was an All-State Soccer Award winner and an All-New England Soccer Team MVP in 1999. Kim is a 3-time New England Champion with the Choate Varsity Track and Field, Soccer and Ice Hockey teams. Kim set and still holds the ice hockey single-season goal scoring record at Choate, with 51 goals, during the 1997-98 regular season.

At Brown
Kim played for the Brown University Bears from 1999 to 2003, and was an extremely important factor in Brown's success those years. She played in one AWCHA National Championship and one NCAA National Frozen Four Final finishing as a runner-up to Minn.-Duluth.

In her freshman season, she was the leading scorer for underclassmen tallying 20 goals and 17 assists, for 37 points. She was named to the First Team All-Ivy Selection, and was also a member of the Brown Women's Soccer Team all 4-years.

In her junior year, Kim tallied 24 goals and 26 assists for a 50-point total, ranking third in scoring for the NCAA that season. She was also a co-captain. She scored the game-winning goal in the ECAC Championship and the NCAA Semi-Final match up against Minnesota.  
 
In her senior year, Kim tallied 9 goals and 23 assists for a 32-point total. She also earned ECAC All-Academic Honors. After her career at Brown, she competed for the Oakville Ice of the National Women's Hockey League.

Team USA
Kim attended U.S Junior National camps from 1994 to 1998, and attended the USA Hockey National Women's Festival for the first time in 1998. She was a member of the USA Under-22 National Team from 1996 to 2002. Kim played for the USA National Team at the Women's World Championship in 2003–2004, and 2004–2005, winning Gold in 2004–2005. In 2005, she again skated for Team USA at the Four Nations Cup in Finland. In 2006, Kim was named to the USA Olympic Team, which won Bronze at the 2006 Olympics in Turin, Italy.

References

1980 births
American women's ice hockey forwards
Brown Bears women's ice hockey players
Choate Rosemary Hall alumni
Ice hockey players from New York (state)
Ice hockey players at the 2006 Winter Olympics
Living people
Medalists at the 2006 Winter Olympics
Olympic bronze medalists for the United States in ice hockey
Sportspeople from Rochester, New York